Schimmelpennin(c)k is a Dutch surname. Notable people with the surname include:

 Gerrit Schimmelpenninck, Prime Minister of the Netherlands (1848)
 Luud Schimmelpennink (born 1935), Dutch social inventor, industrial designer, entrepreneur and politician
 Mary Anne Schimmelpenninck (1778–1856), British writer in the anti-slavery movement
 Otto Schimmelpenninck van der Oije, bass guitarist of the bands Detonation and Delain
 Rutger Jan Schimmelpenninck (1761–1825), Dutch politician of the Batavian Republic
 Monique de Bissy (1923–2009), French/Belgian resistant during World War II
 Schimmelpenninck family

Dutch-language surnames